Newfel Ouatah (born November 8, 1985) is a French–Algerian professional boxer. As an amateur, he won a gold medal at the 2007 African Championships at super heavyweight, a silver medal at the 2007 All-African Games and fought at the 2008 Summer Olympics.

Career
Newfel started boxing in 1998 after the World Cup in France, while all the other children were playing football, he prefer to start boxing in front of his block, at the Club Pugillistique Villeurbannais's Gym.
He fought after two month of training his first educative fight and won it.
Then he became 2000 French champion in the middleweight division (-75 kg). In 2001 he won the French Cadets (under 17) championship in the light heavyweight (-81 kg).

As a Heavyweight he won the 2002 and 2003 Junior (under 19) Nationals championships. He lost in the quarterfinals of the junior world championships when he lost to Robert Alfonso.

He became the 2005 (against Stéphane Gomis) and 2006 French champion at 201 lb by beating John M'Bumba twice time by knock out.
He captured the bronze medal at the 2005 Mediterranean Games.

Then he asked the French federation to agree him to start boxing for his native country.

In 2007 he lost to M'Bumba, went up a division and started fighting for Algeria where he immediately won a silver medal at the All Africa games losing to Ahmed Samir Abdelhalim 8:17.

In 2008 he qualified for the Olympics by beating Stéphane Gomis of Sénegal and Moroccan Mohamed Amanissi 21:8 in a qualifier.

Even in April 2008 he fought his fourth fight against M'Bumba when the fight was amazingly stopped after 1:20 in the last round giving to M'Bumba a disputed winning decision.

In June 2008 he won the St Quentin's Pré Olympic tournament by winning the final against German Erik Pfeifer.
He started his Olympic preparation with Jean Baptiste Mendy's coach, Houari Amri.

In the round of 16 he upset Jose Payares of Venezuela, in the quarter final he was beaten by World Championship silver medallist Vyacheslav Glazkov of Ukraine 4:10.

At the Ahmert COMERT tournament in 2009 he took his revenge against former conqueror and 2007 PanAm and 2008 World Cup winner Robert Alfonso by KO in the second round (one-punch knockout).

Professional career
He turned pro in 2009. His last fight was on February 15, 2020 with Faisal Ibnel Arrami on the opponent side. This boxing fight happened at Gymnase le Bourg located in St Trivier les Courtes which was WON by Newfel Ouatah a Unanimous Decision.

Personal life
Ouatah's the cousin of French football player Karim Benzema, Newfel's and Karim's families are from the same town in Algeria (Ath Djellil). He's also a cousin of famous Algerian singer Hanifa (Hanifa's mother is the sister of Newfel's grandfather).

References

External links
 
 His blog
 World Junior Championships 2004
 French 2005

1985 births
Living people
Heavyweight boxers
Algerian male boxers
Olympic boxers of Algeria
Boxers at the 2008 Summer Olympics
French people of Kabyle descent
Sportspeople from Lyon
Kabyle people
French male boxers
Mediterranean Games bronze medalists for France
Competitors at the 2005 Mediterranean Games
African Games silver medalists for Algeria
African Games medalists in boxing
Mediterranean Games medalists in boxing
Competitors at the 2007 All-Africa Games